The Moluccan cuckoo (Cacomantis aeruginosus) is a species of cuckoo in the family Cuculidae. It is native to the Maluku Islands.

Its natural habitats are subtropical or tropical moist lowland forests and subtropical or tropical moist montane forests.
It is threatened by habitat loss.

References

Moluccan cuckoo
Birds of the Maluku Islands
Endemic fauna of Indonesia
Cuckoo, Moluccan
Cuckoo, Moluccan
Moluccan cuckoo
Taxonomy articles created by Polbot